Bargery is a surname. Notable people with the surname include:

George Percy Bargery (1876–1966), English missionary and linguist 
Nadine Dorries, née Nadine Bargery (born 1957), British politician

See also
 Barger